Frank Lee Wills, Jr. (October 26, 1958 – May 11, 2012) was an American relief pitcher in Major League Baseball for the Kansas City Royals (1983–84), Seattle Mariners (1985), Cleveland Indians (1986–87), and Toronto Blue Jays (1988–91). Wills was an all conference pitcher for Tulane University where he also served as a punter for the Tulane Green Wave football team.

References

External links
 Player statistics at Baseball Reference.

1958 births
2012 deaths
American expatriate baseball players in Canada
Baseball players from New Orleans
Calgary Cannons players
Cleveland Indians players
Kansas City Royals players
Seattle Mariners players
Toronto Blue Jays players
Major League Baseball pitchers
Tulane Green Wave baseball players
Gulf Coast Royals players
Charleston Royals players
Jacksonville Suns players
Omaha Royals players
Maine Guides players
Buffalo Bisons (minor league) players
Syracuse Chiefs players